Teresa Ann Jude O'Neill, Baroness O'Neill of Bexley,  is a British Conservative Party politician, Leader of the Council in the London Borough of Bexley; Vice Chair on London Councils; and Deputy Chair of the Local Government Association.

In the 2022 Special Honours, it was announced that she would receive a life peerage. On 7 November 2022, she was created Baroness O'Neill of Bexley, of Crook Log in the London Borough of Bexley.

References

Living people
Conservative Party (UK) life peers
Life peeresses created by Charles III
Councillors in the London Borough of Bexley
Officers of the Order of the British Empire
21st-century British women politicians
Year of birth missing (living people)